Dondaldina is an extinct genus of high-spired sea snails from the Carboniferous. 

The genus was described by James Brookes Knight in 1933.

Species
 † Donaldina dubia Mazaev, 2015 
 † Donaldina parva Mazaev, 2015 
 † Donaldina sakmaraensis Mazaev, 2020

References 

 Knight J.B. (1933). The gastropods of the St. Louis, Missouri, Pennsylvanian outlier: V. The Trocho-Turbinidae. Journal of Paleontology. 7(1): 30-58.
 Mazaev A.V. (2020). Sakmarian Gastropods from the Samarskaya Luka (Lower Permian, Volga-Urals). Paleontological Journal. 54(10): 1152-1177.

Heterobranchia
Prehistoric mollusc genera
Molluscs described in 1933